Liu Hao (born 20 July 1989) is a Chinese weightlifter. He won the gold medal in Weightlifting at the 2014 Asian Games.

References

Living people
1989 births
Asian Games medalists in weightlifting
Weightlifters at the 2014 Asian Games
Chinese male weightlifters
Asian Games gold medalists for China
Medalists at the 2014 Asian Games
21st-century Chinese people